Neeli Bar (Urdu نیلی بار) is a geographical region in Punjab, Pakistan. It is between the rivers Ravi and Satluj. "Bar" is the name given to areas in Punjab which were thick forests before the arrival of the modern canal irrigation system. Its soil is very fertile, as this plain is formed by the mud that has been collected by rivers flowing from the Himalayas. This region consists of the districts Sahiwal, Okara and Pakpattan . This region is famous for cow /buffalo breed, the Nili-Ravi.

History
This area was the hub of famous war of Independence of 1857, which was led in this area by Rai Ahmad Khan Kharal.

Language and culture
The native language spoken in area is Punjabi, which is a common language of the Bar area, with various dialects. Punjabi Bar Culture is the native culture of region.

References

History of Punjab
History of Punjab, Pakistan
Punjab, Pakistan
Regions of Pakistan
Regions of Punjab, Pakistan